The Duel, also known as Duel of the Iron Fist, is a 1971 Hong Kong martial arts film directed by Chang Cheh and starring Ti Lung, Wang Ping, Yue Wai and David Chiang.

Plot
Tang Ren-jie (Ti Lung) and his older brother Tang Ren-lin (Ku Feng) are triad leader Shen Tian-hung's (Yeung Chi-hing) adopted son and henchman respectively. Shen was involved in a battle against rival triad leader Liu Shou-yi (Ho Ban) where both of them were killed. Jie then takes the initiative to be the scapegoat for the crimes of his brother Lin and Gan Wen-bin (Chuen Yuen), where then he flees to Jiangnan.

However, Gan repeatedly sent murderers to harm Jie while also seizing all of Shen's properties and drives Lin away. With the help of Rambler Jiang Nan (David Chiang), Jie finally kills Gan, but the two of them also dies from their injuries.

Cast
Ti Lung as Tang Ren-jie
Wang Ping as Hu Di
Yue Wai as Ah Shiou
David Chiang as Jian Nan, the Rambler
Chuen Yuen as Gan Wen-bin
Yeung Chi-hing as Shen Tian-hung
Ku Feng as Tang Ren-lin
Cheng Kang-yeh as Siao Mao
Ha Wai as Ling Tze, Factory working Girl
Ho Ban as Liu Shou-yi
Wong Ching-ho as Jau Hai-shan
Hung Lau as Shiu Li
Lee Wah-chung as Senator Feng
Wang Kuang-yu as Liou Song
Lau Gong as Lin Ding-wu
Chiu Hung as Old Jin
Yau Ming as Siao Bao
Lan Wei-lieh as Casino Boss
Jason Pai as Liu Shou-yi's man
Chin Chun as Lao Liu
Bruce Tong as Ah San
Liu Wai as Tattoos Chen Cheh
Yip Po-kam as Factory working Girl
Poon Oi-lun as Factory working Girl
Kuo Pei as Factory working Girl
Kuo Yi as Factory working Girl
Chan Sing as Gan's man
Cheng Lui as Gan's man
Wong Chung as Gan's man
Cliff Lok as Gan's man
Wu Chi-chin as Gan's man
Pao Chia-wen as Gan's man
Yeung Pak-chan as Gan's man
Lai Yan as Gan's man
Yeung Chen-sing as Gan's man on train
Wong Pau-kei as Gan's man torturing Jie
Wong Ching as Gan's man torturing Jie
Tang Cheung as Gan's man on train
Yuen Woo-ping as Gan's man who turns on lights
Wong Mei as Liu Shou-yi's guard
Tung Coi-bo as Liu Shou-yi's guard
Yeung Wai as Liu Shou-yi's guard
Chan Bo as Liu Shou-yi's guard
Chen Kuan-tai as Liu Shou-yi's guard
Yuen Shun-yi as Liu Shou-yi's guard
Ho Bo-sing as Liu Shou-yi's guard
Chui Fat as Thug on street
Law Keung as Thug on street
Danny Chow as Thug on street
Tang Tak-cheung as Thug on street
Yuen Cheung-yan as Old Jin's man
Ho Pak-kwong as Casino Clerk
Ko Hung as Casino thug
Lau Chung-fai as Casino thug
Lee Siu-wai as Casino thug
Tsang Cho-lam as Brothel Staff
Cheung Sek-au as Brothel Staff
Ko Chiu as Factory foreman
Yen Shi-kwan as Killed 4 times
Tam Ying as Pedestrian
Ting Hon as Liu Shou-yi's man
Cheung Chi-ping as Gan's man
Fung Hap-so as Gan's man
Ng Yuen-fan as Gan's man
Chik Ngai-hung as Gan's man
Hsu Hsia as Gan's man
Wan Ling-kwong as Gan's man
Fung Hak-on as Gan's man
Chan Siu-kai as Gan's man
Lee Chiu as Gan's man
Tam Wing-kit as Gan's man
Lei Lung as Gan's man
Lo Wai as Gan's man
Huang Ha
Yeung Chak-lam
Chan Sing-tong
Lau Kar-wing

Reception

Critical
The film received generally positive reviews. Glenn Heath Jr. of Slant Magazine rated the film 3.5 out of 5 stars and writes "The Duel turns in violent circles for most of its running time, but the final battle sequence gratuitously displays the film's keen attempt at political commentary." City on Fire rated the film an 8.5 out of 10 and writes "The Duel is a well-paced, action packed tale that won't disappoint. It's the perfect example of Chang Cheh’s slickness. It's also one of Ti Lung’s and David Chiang’s coolest roles together." Ian Jane of DVD Talk rated the film 4 out of 5 stars and praised its action scenes, interesting plot twists and the performances by Ti and Chiang.

Box office
The film grossed HK$1,375,619.20 at the Hong Kong box office during its theatrical run from 21 April to 6 May 1971 in Hong Kong.

References

External links

The Duel at Hong Kong Cinemagic

1971 films
1970s action thriller films
1970s martial arts films
Hong Kong action thriller films
Hong Kong martial arts films
Kung fu films
Triad films
1970s Mandarin-language films
Shaw Brothers Studio films
Films directed by Chang Cheh
Films set in China
Films shot in Hong Kong
Hong Kong films about revenge
1970s Hong Kong films